José Joaquín Flórez Hernández (12 November 1916 – 22 June 1996) was a Roman Catholic Bishop in Colombia. He was Bishop of Duitama–Sogamoso from 1955 to 1964, then Bishop from 1964 to 1974 and Archbishop from 1974 to 1993 of Ibagué.

References

1916 births
1996 deaths
20th-century Roman Catholic archbishops in Colombia
Roman Catholic bishops of Ibagué
Roman Catholic archbishops of Ibagué
Roman Catholic bishops of Duitama-Sogamoso